Pseudocharopa whiteleggei, also known as Whitelegge's pinwheel snail or Whitelegge's land snail, is a species of pinwheel snail that is endemic to Australia's Lord Howe Island in the Tasman Sea. 

It is the largest charopid species in Australia.

Description
The ear-shaped shell of mature snails is 7.1–8.3 mm in height, with a diameter of 15.6–17.7 mm, discoidal with a flat spire and impressed sutures. It is dark reddish-brown with indistinct zigzag, cream-coloured flammulations (flame-like markings). The umbilicus is moderately wide. The ovately lunate aperture is flattened on the upper edge. The animal has a lime-green sole and dark grey upper body, neck, head and eye-tentacles.

Habitat
The snail is known mainly from the summits and upper slopes of Mount Lidgbird and Mount Gower, living in rainforest leaf litter.

Conservation
The snail has been subject to predation by introduced rodents and is considered to be Critically Endangered.

References

External links
 Brazier, J. (1889). Mollusca. In: Etheridge, R (ed.) The general zoology of Lord Howe Island; containing also an account of the collections made by the Australian Museum Collecting Party, Aug.–Sept., 1887, pp. 22-30. Memoirs of the Australian Museum. 2: 1-42
  Iredale, T. (1944). The land Mollusca of Lord Howe Island. The Australian Zoologist. 10(3): 299-334
 
 

 
whiteleggei
Gastropods of Lord Howe Island
Taxa named by John Brazier
Gastropods described in 1889